William de Falaise (11th century), also called William of Falaise, was a Norman from Falaise, Duchy of Normandy, today in the Calvados department in the Lower Normandy region of north-western France. He became feudal baron of Stogursey in Somerset and also held manors in Devon.

Biography
William married Geva de Burci (her second husband), who was the daughter and sole heiress of Serlo de Burcy, feudal baron of Blagdon, Somerset, which barony is sometimes stated to be of Dartington, Devon, as the caput cannot be clearly assigned exclusively to either place. Geva's first husband was "Martin" (died before 1086) for whom she produced a son and heir, Robert fitz Martin (died 1159), who with his descendants were feudal barons of Blagdon. William's daughter and sole heiress to the feudal barony of Stogursey was Emma of Falaise, who married William de Courcy (died about 1114), to whose descendants the barony of Stogursey passed. The Devon lands of William of Falaise however passed to the FitzMartin family, feudal barons of Blagdon, who were sometimes seated at his former manor of Dartington.

Landholdings
The Exeter Domesday Book lists him as holding the following 17 Devon manors as a tenant-in-chief of the king:
Combe Martin, in Braunton Hundred
Furse, possibly Furze in West Buckland in Braunton Hundred
Parracombe, in Shirwell Hundred
Churchill, in East Down parish, Braunton Hundred
"Beare", possibly a lost Beare in Worlington, Witheridge Hundred
Washford Pyne in Witheridge Hundred
Worlington, in Witheridge Hundred
Bradford, in Witheridge Hundred
Densham, in Woolfardisworthy parish
Cockington, in Haytor Hundred
Holne, now a parish, in Stanborough Hundred
Stoke, in Holne parish, in Stanborough Hundred
Dean Prior, a parish in Stanborough Hundred
Rattery, a parish in Stanborough Hundred
Dartington, a parish in Stanborough Hundred
Harbourneford, in South Brent parish in Stanborough Hundred
Englebourne, now in Harberton parish, Coleridge Hundred.

He is listed as Wilts de Faleise, holding 3 Somerset manors as tenant-in-chief:
Stogursey, in Cannington Hundred
Wootton [Courtenay], in Carhampton Hundred
Woodspring, in Winterstoke Hundred

Sources
Thorn, Caroline & Frank, Domesday Book, Vol. 9, Devon, vol. 1, Chichester, 1985, Chapter 20, holdings of William de Falaise.
Sanders, Ivor J., 'Barony of Blagdon' in English Baronies (Oxford, 1960), p. 15,

References

Anglo-Normans
Devon Domesday Book tenants-in-chief
Feudal barons of Stoke Courcy